Stéphanie Leclair (born 15 January 1990) is a Canadian synchronized swimmer. She competed in the women's team event at the 2012 Olympic Games.

References 

1990 births
Living people
Canadian synchronized swimmers
Olympic synchronized swimmers of Canada
Sportspeople from Gatineau
Synchronized swimmers at the 2012 Summer Olympics
World Aquatics Championships medalists in synchronised swimming
Synchronized swimmers at the 2013 World Aquatics Championships
Synchronized swimmers at the 2015 World Aquatics Championships
Synchronized swimmers at the 2011 World Aquatics Championships
Synchronized swimmers at the 2009 World Aquatics Championships
Synchronized swimmers at the 2011 Pan American Games
Pan American Games gold medalists for Canada
Pan American Games medalists in synchronized swimming
Medalists at the 2011 Pan American Games
20th-century Canadian women
21st-century Canadian women